Kasimkota is a village in Anakapalli district in the state of Andhra Pradesh in India. Kasimkota was one of the notable villages affected by Cyclone Hudhud.

Kasimkota is also part of the second largest jaggery market of the country in Anakapalle.

References 

Villages in Anakapalli district